Flos is a genus of butterflies in the family Lycaenidae. The species of this genus are commonly known as plushblues and are found in the Indomalayan realm.

Species
Flos diardi (Hewitson, 1862) - shining plushblue, bifid plushblue
Flos fulgida (Hewitson, 1863) - shining plushblue
Flos bungo Evans, 1957
Flos kuehni (Röber, 1887) - Kuehn's plushblue
Flos anniella (Hewitson, 1862)
Flos apidanus (Cramer, [1777]) - plain pushblue
Flos arca (de Nicéville, [1893])
Flos iriya (Fruhstorfer, 1914)
Flos adriana (de Nicéville, [1884]) - variegated plushblue
Flos asoka (de Nicéville, [1884])
Flos areste (Hewitson, 1862) - tailless plushblue
Flos chinensis (C. & R. Felder, [1865]) - Chinese plushblue
Flos morphina (Distant, 1884)
Flos setsuroi Hayashi, 1981

External links

"Flos Doherty, 1889" at Markku Savela's Lepidoptera and Some Other Life Forms

 
Arhopalini
Lycaenidae genera
Taxa named by William Doherty